The province of Kalinga has 153 barangays comprising its 7 municipalities and 1 city.

Barangays

References

Kalinga
Populated places in Kalinga (province)